Whitton is a small town located in Leeton Shire in the Australian state of New South Wales and is located 23km west of the Leeton township. Founded in 1850, it is named after John Whitton (1820–98), Engineer-in-Charge of the New South Wales Government Railways. The railway reached Whitton in 1881.

History
Whitton was originally named "Hulong" and is the oldest town in the Murrumbidgee Irrigation Area. It developed on a main teamster route transporting goods to the South-West of New South Wales. Hulong was renamed to Whitton in 1883.

Services
The Whitton township contains the Ricebowl Hotel, a general store, a post office, St Carthage Catholic Church (closed), Whitton Uniting Church (closed), St John's Anglican Church, a fire station, a bowling club, a primary school, a public swimming pool and a number of houses.

Whitton also supports several Agribusiness manufacturing business such as Southern Cotton's Cotton gin and Voyager Malt's craft Malt production facility, as well as a regional tourist attraction, the Whitton Malt House that was opened in late 2020.

Sport
Whitton formerly had a rugby league team competing in the Group 17 Rugby League competition, known as the Whitton Bulls. They won the competition in 1998 and 2001, and reached numerous Grand Finals around this period, before folding in the mid 2000s. The club's home ground, the Whitton Sports Ground, has since been abandoned and fallen into a state of disrepair. The site, which still contains the timekeeper's box, rusted rugby league goalposts and the remains of the clubrooms amongst the overgrown weeds, has become a site frequented by curious explorers. The ground is located on the Whitton-Darlington Point Road, about 100 metres south of the intersection on the bend of the Irrigation Way.

The town nominally has a merged Australian Rules Football team, the Leeton-Whitton Crows, who play in the Riverina Football League, although the club has not played in Whitton for many decades. Prior to merging with Leeton, the town had a team with Yanco, known as the Whitton-Yanco Tigers.

Gallery

References

Leeton Shire
Towns in New South Wales